Churuya, also known as Bisanigua and Guaigua, is an extinct Guahiban language of Colombia.

References

Languages of Colombia
Guajiboan languages